Leo Smyth (14 March 1934 – 2 June 1978) was  a former Australian rules footballer who played with Fitzroy in the Victorian Football League (VFL).

Notes

External links 		
		
		
		
		
		
		
		
1934 births		
1978 deaths		
Australian rules footballers from Victoria (Australia)		
Fitzroy Football Club players